Temple Beautiful is the twelfth full-length album by American singer-songwriter Chuck Prophet. It was released in the U.S. on February 7, 2012, through Yep Roc Records. Burger Records released a limited run of 150 cassette tapes.

Temple Beautiful is named after a long-closed rock and roll club that was between Bill Graham's iconic Fillmore and the storefront church founded by the Reverend Jim Jones. According to Prophet: "These songs off my new record. It’s a very SF-centric record. I’ve been tapping into the history, the weirdness, the energy and spontaneity that brought me here in the first place.”

Cultural references

The album references a number of characters and locations from San Francisco's history, including:
Willie Mays
The Mitchell Brothers
Jim Jones
Laughing Sal
Red Man
Dan White
Castro District
Emperor Norton
Mission District
Harvey Milk
Carol Doda
White Night riots

Critical reception
Exclaim! called the album "the sound of a mature rock'n'roller continuing to reach for new heights." PopMatters called it "a fun, tuneful rock 'n' roll record that's both straight from the gut and as wonderfully curved as the city which inspired it."

Track listing

All songs written by Chuck Prophet and klipschutz

 "Play That Song Again"
 "Castro Halloween"
 "Temple Beautiful"
 "Museum of Broken Hearts"
 "Willie Mays is Up at Bat"
 "The Left Hand and the Right Hand"
 "I Felt Like Jesus"
 "Who Shot John"
 "He Came From So Far Away (Red Man Speaks)"
 "Little Girl, Little Boy"
 "White Night, Big City"
 "Emperor Norton in the Last Year of His Life (1880)"

Personnel

Produced by Brad Jones and Chuck Prophet
Recorded in San Francisco at Decibelle
Engineered by Brad Jones and Drew Zajicek
Mixed by Brad Jones at Alex The Great
Mastered by Richard Dodd
Chuck Prophet – guitars, vocals
James DePrato – guitars
Rusty Miller – bass, vocals
Prairie Prince – drums, percussion
with:
Stephanie Finch – vocals
Roy Loney – vocal on "Temple Beautiful”
Chris Carmichael – cello, violin
Jim Hoke – woodwinds, flute
Brad Jones – piano

References

Works cited
  Collum, Danny (2012). "Temple Beautiful" U.S. Catholic 2012 vol:(77) 4
 Liner Notes from "Temple Beautiful"

External links
 Temple Beautiful at Chuck Prophet's catalog page Temple Beautiful
 Temple Beautiful Video 

2012 albums
Yep Roc Records albums